Guillaume Louis DeBuys (July 19, 1798 – May 24, 1856) was a member of the Louisiana State House of Representatives.

A veteran of the War of 1812, DeBuys was born near New Orleans and served as Speaker of the Louisiana House in 1839-1841 and later participated in the gubernatorial election of 1846, when was defeated by Isaac Johnson.

External links 
Guillaume Louis DeBuys

1798 births
1856 deaths
Members of the Louisiana House of Representatives
Speakers of the Louisiana House of Representatives
American military personnel of the War of 1812
19th-century American politicians
Louisiana Whigs